Lukovit is a town in northern Bulgaria, part of Lovech Province. It is situated on both banks of the Zlatna Panega between the Danubian Plain and the foot of Stara Planina. As of December 2009, the town has a population of 9,630 inhabitants.

The town was first mentioned in Ottoman registers of 1430. In 1495, it had 47 households. Between 1683 and 1687, Lukovit was part of an Ottoman process of forceful Islamization, but was never completely converted as late as 1860 when it had 250 Muslim Bulgarian and 260 Eastern Orthodox households. After the Liberation of Bulgaria, all the Muslims left the town.

Buried artefacts from the 4th century BC Thracian culture, the Lukovit Treasure (Bulgarian: Луковитско съкровище) comprising horse brasses made of silver, were found in 1953 near the town.

Honour
Lukovit Point on Livingston Island, South Shetland Islands is named after Lukovit.
The local football team is Botev Lukovit.

See also
Aglen
Lovech
Petrevene
Teteven

References

External links
 Official municipal website
 Lukovit article and photos at Pictures Of Bulgaria
 Local Geopark
 A walk around the region of Lukovit, rivers Panega and Iskar, cave Prohodna (Проходна)

Towns in Bulgaria
Populated places in Lovech Province